The 2023 Hamilton Centre provincial by-election was held on March 16, 2023. The Ontario New Democratic Party's Sarah Jama won the election.

Background

Constituency 
The Hamilton Centre constituency consists of the part of the City of Hamilton bounded by a line drawn south from the city limit along Ottawa Street, west along the Niagara Escarpment, southwest along James Mountain Road, south along West 5th Street, west along Lincoln M. Alexander Parkway, north along the hydroelectric transmission line situated west of Upper Horning Road, northeast along Highway No. 403, east along the Desjardins Canal to Hamilton Harbour.

Trigger 
On July 26, 2022, incumbent MPP Andrea Horwath announced her candidacy for mayor of Hamilton, and resigned her seat in the provincial legislature on August 15, 2022.

Candidates 

 Peter House, Electoral Reform Party
 Lucia Iannantuono, Green Party of Ontario
 Sarah Jama, Ontario New Democratic Party
 Matthew Lingard, Independent
 Pete Wiesner, Progressive Conservative Party of Ontario
 Deirdre Pike, Ontario Liberal Party
 Mark Snow, Ontario Libertarian Party
 John Turmel, Independent
 Lee Weiss Vassor, New Blue Party of Ontario
 Nathalie Xian Yi Yan, Independent

Result

Previous result

References 

Politics of Ontario
Hamilton, Ontario
Provincial by-elections in Ontario
2023 elections in Canada
2023 in Ontario
March 2023 events in Canada